Fort Whitman (Washington) was an Endicott Board fortification on Goat Island, Puget Sound, Washington state, just offshore of La Conner, a part of the Harbor Defenses of Puget Sound.  It comprised a single 4 gun 6" DC battery, Battery Harrison, and mine control structures. The usual barracks and other support facilities were temporary and built for the duration, excepting a caretaker's quarters.  It protected the confined back passage east of Fidalgo Island, Skagit Bay.  By World War II, the six-inch DCs were no longer required; the main armament was 37mm AMTB guns.

Except during wartime, the fort remained on caretaking status throughout its existence.

References

External links 
 Fortwiki site 

Whitman
Parks in Skagit County, Washington
State parks of Washington (state)
History of Skagit County, Washington
1900 establishments in Washington (state)
1948 disestablishments in Washington (state)